Kim Dae-Yoong (also Kim Dae-Ung, ; born February 18, 1988, in Seoul) is a South Korean sport shooter. He won a bronze medal in the men's rapid fire pistol at the 2012 ISSF World Cup series in Munich, Germany, with a total score of 585 points and a bonus of 25 from the final, earning him a spot on the South Korean team for the Olympics. Kim is also a member of the shooting team for KB Kookmin Bank Club, and is coached and trained by Son Sang-Won.

Kim represented South Korea at the 2012 Summer Olympics in London, where he competed in the men's 25 m rapid fire pistol. Kim scored a total of 579 targets (290 on the first stage and 289 on the second) and a bonus of 20 inner tens in the qualifying rounds by one point behind Czech shooter and two-time Olympian Martin Strnad, finishing only in tenth place.

References

External links
NBC Olympics Profile

1988 births
Living people
South Korean male sport shooters
Olympic shooters of South Korea
Shooters at the 2012 Summer Olympics
Sport shooters from Seoul
Universiade medalists in shooting
Universiade silver medalists for South Korea
Medalists at the 2013 Summer Universiade
20th-century South Korean people
21st-century South Korean people